The Spider is a 1940 British, black-and-white, crime, drama, thriller directed by Maurice Elvey and starring Derrick De Marney and Diana Churchill. It was produced by Admiral Films.

Synopsis
A talent agent whose corrupt actions are uncovered by his business partner murders him. A young woman witnesses the murder. The talent agent attacks her, she is traumatised and loses her memory. After she is released from hospital, the talent agent resumes his chase, but a detective and his wife intervene.

Cast
Derrick De Marney as Gilbert Silver
Diana Churchill as Sally Silver
Jean Gillie as Clare Marley
Cecil Parker as Lawrence Bruce
Frank Cellier as Julian Ismay
Allan Jeayes as George Hackett
Edward Lexy as Inspector Horridge
Jack Melford as Duke
Jack Lambert as Smith
Anthony Holles as Bath's Manager
Moira Lynd as Nurse

References

External links
 
 
 

1940 films
1940 crime drama films
1940s crime thriller films
British black-and-white films
1940s English-language films
Films directed by Maurice Elvey
British crime drama films
British crime thriller films
1940s British films